Didier Couécou (born 25 July 1944) is a former  French footballer who played striker. He was part of France national football team at the FIFA World Cup 1966.

References
Profile
Stats

1944 births
Living people
French footballers
France international footballers
Association football forwards
Ligue 1 players
FC Girondins de Bordeaux players
OGC Nice players
Olympique de Marseille players
FC Nantes players
1966 FIFA World Cup players
French football managers
FC Girondins de Bordeaux managers